In psychology, the false consensus effect, also known as consensus bias, is a pervasive cognitive bias that causes people to “see their own behavioral choices and judgments as relatively common and appropriate to existing circumstances”. In other words, they assume that their personal qualities, characteristics, beliefs, and actions are relatively widespread through the general population.

This false consensus is significant because it increases self-esteem (overconfidence effect). It can be derived from a desire to conform and be liked by others in a social environment. This bias is especially prevalent in group settings where one thinks the collective opinion of their own group matches that of the larger population. Since the members of a group reach a consensus and rarely encounter those who dispute it, they tend to believe that everybody thinks the same way. The false-consensus effect is not restricted to cases where people believe that their values are shared by the majority, but it still manifests as an overestimate of the extent of their belief. 

Additionally, when confronted with evidence that a consensus does not exist, people often assume that those who do not agree with them are defective in some way. There is no single cause for this cognitive bias; the availability heuristic, self-serving bias, and naïve realism have been suggested as at least partial underlying factors. The bias may also result, at least in part, from non-social stimulus-reward associations. Maintenance of this cognitive bias may be related to the tendency to make decisions with relatively little information. When faced with uncertainty and a limited sample from which to make decisions, people often "project" themselves onto the situation. When this personal knowledge is used as input to make generalizations, it often results in the false sense of being part of the majority.

The false consensus effect has been widely observed and supported by empirical evidence. Previous research has suggested that cognitive and perceptional factors (motivated projection, accessibility of information, emotion, etc.) may contribute to the consensus bias, while recent studies have focused on its neural mechanisms. One recent study has shown that consensus bias may improve decisions about other people's preferences. Ross, Green and House first defined the false consensus effect in 1977 with emphasis on the relative commonness that people perceive about their own responses; however, similar projection phenomena had already caught attention in psychology. Specifically, concerns with respect to connections between individual’s personal predispositions and their estimates of peers appeared in the literature for a while. For instances, Katz and Allport in 1931 illustrated that students’ estimates of the amount of others on the frequency of cheating was positively correlated to their own behavior. Later, around 1970, same phenomena were found on political beliefs and prisoner’s dilemma situation. In 2017, researchers identified a persistent egocentric bias when participants learned about other people's snack-food preferences. Moreover, recent studies suggest that the false consensus effect can also affect professional decision makers; specifically, it has been shown that even experienced marketing managers project their personal product preferences onto consumers.

Major theoretical approaches 
The false-consensus effect can be traced back to two parallel theories of social perception, "the study of how we form impressions of and make inferences about other people". The first is the idea of social comparison. The principal claim of Leon Festinger's (1954) social comparison theory was that individuals evaluate their thoughts and attitudes based on other people. This may be motivated by a desire for confirmation and the need to feel good about oneself. As an extension of this theory, people may use others as sources of information to define social reality and guide behavior. This is called informational social influence. The problem, though, is that people are often unable to accurately perceive the social norm and the actual attitudes of others. In other words, research has shown that people are surprisingly poor "intuitive psychologists" and that our social judgments are often inaccurate. This finding helped to lay the groundwork for an understanding of biased processing and inaccurate social perception. The false-consensus effect is just one example of such an inaccuracy.

The second influential theory is projection, the idea that people project their own attitudes and beliefs onto others. This idea of projection is not a new concept. In fact, it can be found in Sigmund Freud's work on the defense mechanism of projection, D.S. Holmes' work on "attributive projection" (1968), and Gustav Ichheisser's work on social perception (1970). D.S. Holmes, for example, described social projection as the process by which people "attempt to validate their beliefs by projecting their own characteristics onto other individuals".

Here a connection can be made between the two stated theories of social comparison and projection. First, as social comparison theory explains, individuals constantly look to peers as a reference group and are motivated to do so in order to seek confirmation for their own attitudes and beliefs. 

The false-consensus effect, as defined by Ross, Greene, and House in 1977, came to be the culmination of the many related theories that preceded it. In their well-known series of four studies, Ross and associates hypothesized and then demonstrated that people tend to overestimate the popularity of their own beliefs and preferences. Studies were both conducted in hypothetical situations by questionnaire surveys and in authentic conflict situations. For questionnaire studies, participants were presented with hypothetical events and then were not only asked to indicate their own behavioral choices and characteristics under the provided circumstances, but also asked to rate the responses and traits of their peers who referred as "actors". As for real occasion studies, participants were actually confronted with the conflict situations in which they were asked to choose behavioral alternatives and to judge the traits as well as decisions of two supposedly true individuals who had attended in the study.   In general, the raters made more "extreme predictions" about the personalities of the actors that did not share the raters' own preference. In fact, the raters may have even thought that there was something wrong with the people expressing the alternative response.

In the ten years after the influential Ross et al. study, close to 50 papers were published with data on the false-consensus effect. Theoretical approaches were also expanded. The theoretical perspectives of this era can be divided into four categories: (a) selective exposure and cognitive availability, (b) salience and focus of attention, (c) logical information processing, and (d) motivational processes. In general, the researchers and designers of these theories believe that there is not a single right answer. Instead, they admit that there is overlap among the theories and that the false-consensus effect is most likely due to a combination of these factors.

Selective exposure and cognitive availability
This theory is closely tied to the availability heuristic, which suggests that perceptions of similarity (or difference) are affected by how easily those characteristics can be recalled from memory. And as one might expect, similarities between oneself and others are more easily recalled than differences. This is in part because people usually associate with those who are similar to themselves. This selected exposure to similar people may bias or restrict the "sample of information about the true diversity of opinion in the larger social environment". As a result of the selective exposure and availability heuristic, it is natural for the similarities to prevail in one's thoughts.

 did a popular study on the effects of the false-consensus effect among a specific adolescent community in an effort to determine whether students show a higher level of false-consensus effect among their direct peers as opposed to society at large. The participants of this experiment were 203 college students ranging in age from 18 to 25 (with an average age of 18.5). The participants were given a questionnaire and asked to answer questions regarding a variety of social topics. For each social topic, they were asked to answer how they felt about the topic and to estimate the percentage of their peers who would agree with them. The results determined that the false-consensus effect was extremely prevalent when participants were describing the rest of their college community; out of twenty topics considered, sixteen of them prominently demonstrated the false-consensus effect. The high levels of false-consensus effect seen in this study can be attributed to the group studied; because the participants were asked to compare themselves to a group of peers that they are constantly around (and view as very similar to themselves), the levels of false-consensus effect increased.

Salience and focus of attention
This theory suggests that when an individual focuses solely on their own preferred position, they are more likely to overestimate its popularity, thus falling victim to the false-consensus effect. This is because that position is the only one in their immediate consciousness. Performing an action that promotes the position will make it more salient and may increase the false-consensus effect. If, however, more positions are presented to the individual, the degree of the false-consensus effect might decrease significantly.

Logical information processing
This theory assumes that active and seemingly rational thinking underlies an individual's estimates of similarity among others. 
In a study done by Fox, Yinon, and Mayraz, researchers were attempting to determine whether or not the levels of the false-consensus effect changed in different age groups. In order to come to a conclusion, it was necessary for the researchers to split their participants into four different age groups. Two hundred participants were used, and gender was not considered to be a factor. Just as in the previous study mentioned, this study used a questionnaire as its main source of information. The results showed that the false-consensus effect was extremely prevalent in all groups, but was the most prevalent in the oldest age group (the participants who were labeled as "old-age home residents"). They showed the false-consensus effect in all 12 areas that they were questioned about. The increase in false-consensus effect seen in the oldest age group can be accredited to their high level of "logical" reasoning behind their decisions; the oldest age group has obviously lived the longest, and therefore feels that they can project their beliefs onto all age groups due to their (seemingly objective) past experiences and wisdom. The younger age groups cannot logically relate to those older to them because they have not had that experience and do not pretend to know these objective truths. These results demonstrate a tendency for older people to rely more heavily on situational attributions (life experience) as opposed to internal attributions.

Motivational processes
This theory stresses the benefits of the false-consensus effect: namely, the perception of increased social validation, social support, and self-esteem. It may also be useful to exaggerate similarities in social situations in order to increase liking.

Belief in a favorable future 
The concept of false consensus effect can also be extended to predictions about future others. Belief in a favorable future is the belief that future others will change their preferences and beliefs in alignment with one's own. 

Rogers, Moore, and Norton (2017) find that belief in a favorable future is greater in magnitude than the false-consensus effect for two reasons: 
 It is based in future others whose beliefs are not directly observable, and
 It is focused on future beliefs, which gives these future others time to “discover” the truth and change their beliefs.

See also

 Abilene paradox
 
 
 
 
 
 
 
 
 
 
 
 
 
 Social comparison bias
 
 Value (ethics)

References

Notes

Sources

Further reading

External links
 Changing minds: the false consensus effect
 Overcoming Bias: Mind Projection Fallacy

Cognitive biases
Group processes
Consensus